The 1999 ATP Buenos Aires was an ATP Challenger Series tennis tournament held in Buenos Aires, Argentina. The tournament was held November 15 to 22, 1999.

Finals

Singles
 Franco Squillari defeated  Hernán Gumy 5–7, 6–1, 6–4

Doubles
 Guillermo Cañas /  Martín García defeated  Paul Rosner /  Dušan Vemić 6–4, 6–-4

External links
 International Tennis Federation (ITF) tournament edition details

 
ATP Buenos Aires
ATP Buenos Aires
November 1999 sports events in South America